Broadway is an extinct town in Maries County, in the U.S. state of Missouri.

A post office called Broadway was established in 1898, and remained in operation until 1921. The community was named in jest, as the nearby country road was referred to as "Broadway" by locals.

References

Ghost towns in Missouri
Former populated places in Maries County, Missouri